Hols IF  is a sports club in Hol, Sweden, established 30 April 1944.

The women's soccer team played in the Swedish top division in 1978.

References

External links
Official website 

Football clubs in Västra Götaland County
Sports clubs established in 1944
Association football clubs established in 1944
Bandy clubs established in 1944
Defunct bandy clubs in Sweden
Table tennis clubs in Sweden
Athletics clubs in Sweden
Swedish handball clubs
1944 establishments in Sweden
Sport in Västra Götaland County
Ski clubs in Sweden
Handball clubs established in 1944
Multi-sport clubs in Sweden